Carditamera gracilis, or the West Indian cardita, is a species of bivalve mollusc in the family Carditidae. It can be found off the coast of the West Indies.

Description
Carditamera gracilis has an elongated shell, strong medium size about 40 mm. It has more pronounced radial rib and high in the back. Its color is white with brown spots; inside is pearly.

Distribution
Carditamera gracilis is distributed through the Gulf of Mexico and the Caribbean Sea.

Habitat
It usually inhabits shallow water, attached to rocky substrates.

References

Carditidae
Bivalves described in 1856